Global United Media Company Private Limited is a corporate entity in the Indian film markets formed in March 2014. The company's core engagement is film production, acquisition and distribution across languages, genres and territories. Global United Media has distributed films such as K.G.F: Chapter 1,  
Baahubali: The Beginning (2015), I (2015) across Kerala.

Team
 Prem Menon (Director)

History
Global United Media Company Pvt Ltd was formed in March 2014, under the leadership of Mr. Prem Menon. Founded for film production, acquisition and distribution across languages, genres and territories.

Films

Film productions

As a distributor

Achievements
Global United Media was awarded the Record by Guinness World Records for World's Largest Poster for the film Baahubali which was created during the Audio Launch Event at Kochi, Kerala. The reference book made the declaration on its official website. "The largest poster has an area of 4,793.65 sq m (51,598.21 sq ft) and was achieved by Global United Media Company Pvt Ltd (India) in Kochi, India, on 27 June 2015," it said.

References

Film production companies based in Chennai
Indian companies established in 2014
2014 establishments in Tamil Nadu
Mass media companies established in 2014